St Teresa's GAA may refer to:

St Teresa's GAC (Antrim), a sports club
Loughmacrory St Teresa's GAC, a sports club